Runaway Blues is a 1989 Hong Kong action film directed by David Lai and starring Andy Lau and Kelvin Wong. Due to its amount of violence, the film was rated Category III by the Hong Kong motion picture rating system.

Plot
Southern Taiwanese triad member Lam Kong (Andy Lau) flees to Hong Kong after killing another triad leader (Blackie Ko) in a motorcycle race. He hides in the house of triad leader Nip Ching's (Chan King-cheung) mistress Sue (Shirley Lui), who is also the lover of Nip's underling Chiu Kwai (Sunny Fong). Nip thinks highly of Kong due to his hard work and living up his demand to assist Chui Kwai in trading.

Detective Ronny Cambridge (Robert Zajac) has been investigating Nip and Chiu's illegal activities and after his informant was recently killed, he blackmails Kong to be his new informant. Kong becomes pressured and Sue comforts him and gives him encouragements. As they spend time together, Kong and Sue gradually fall in love with each other.

During a deal of Rolex watches between Chiu and mainland Chinese triad Wah (Kelvin Wong), the goods suddenly disappear and Wah suspects Kong has stolen them. Being persecuted by Wah, Kong flees to Guangzhou, before finally heading to Macau and plans to bring Sue with him back to Taiwan.

Cast
Andy Lau as Lam Kong
Shirley Lui as Sue Shek
Ngok Ling as Kong's girlfriend from Taiwan
Sunny Fong as Chiu Kwai
Blackie Ko as Rival triad
Kelvin Wong as Wah
 as Nip Ching's wife
Chan King-cheung as Nip Ching
Robert Zajac as Ronny Cambridge
Cheung Sai
Ng Ping-nam
Chu Tai
So Lai-chu
Hon San

Theme song
"Do I Really Have Nothing Left" (是否我真的一無所有)
Composer: Chen Chih-yuan
Lyricist: Fred Chen
Singer: Dave Wong

Box office
The film grossed HK$5,661,927 at the Hong Kong box office during its theatrical run from 3 to 15 March 1989 in Hong Kong.

See also
Andy Lau filmography
List of Hong Kong Category III films

External links

Runaway Blues at Hong Kong Cinemagic

1989 films
1989 martial arts films
1989 action films
1980s gang films
Hong Kong action films
Hong Kong martial arts films
Hong Kong gangster films
Triad films
1980s Cantonese-language films
Films set in Hong Kong
Films set in Taiwan
Films set in Guangzhou
Films set in Macau
Films shot in Hong Kong
Films shot in China
Films shot in Taiwan
Films shot in Macau
1980s Hong Kong films